Baron Aton is an abeyant title in the Peerage of England. It was created by Writ of summons to Parliament of Gilbert de Aton of Ayton (now West Ayton), North Yorkshire on 30 December 1324. It passed to his son William, but fell into abeyance upon the death of William without male heirs in 1373.

Baron Aton (1324)
By Writ
Gilbert de Aton, 1st Baron Aton (d. 1342)
William de Aton, 2nd Baron Aton (d. 1373), son and heir, married Isabel Percy, died 1373, his son William died in his minority, thus the barony fell into abeyance between his daughters Elizabeth, Katherine, and Anastasia, upon the 2nd baron's death.

Citations

References

1324 establishments in England
Baronies by writ
History of Yorkshire
Abeyant baronies in the Peerage of England
Noble titles created in 1324